As the World Rolls On, also known by its working title The Heart of Jack Johnson, is a 1921 drama film starring Jack Johnson. It was an Andlauer Productions film. It was advertised as featuring an "All-Star Colored Cast". The film features footage of National Negro League baseball games. It is a 7-reel film.

The storyline of the film features Johnson teaching physical fitness to a weak man and an attempt to frame someone for a crime. Newspaper publisher Nelson Crews has a cameo in the film. Filming was done in Kansas City, Missouri where the Andlauer production company was based, as well as St. Joseph, Missouri and Topeka.

Production
The film was made by William Anthony Andlauer. He was a theater owner, photographer, and cinematographer.

Historical significance
Up until 2013—when a film clip from 1919 was found in storage at a Georgia plantation—As the World Rolls On was the earliest known film to show African-American baseball players, containing "footage of an all-black Kansas team."

Cast
Jack Johnson as himself
Blanche Thompson as Molly Moran
Reed Thomas as Joe Walker
Walter Simpson as Tom Atkins
Versia Rice
Sam Crawford as himself
Bruce Petway as himself
Rube Foster as himself
Cristóbal Torriente as himself

See also 
 For His Mother's Sake (another film starring Johnson)

References

1921 films
Negro league baseball